Rosehill Cemetery (founded 1859) is an American garden cemetery on the North Side of Chicago, Illinois, and at , is the largest cemetery in the City of Chicago. According to legend, the name "Rosehill" resulted from a City Clerk's error – the area was previously called "Roe's Hill", named for nearby farmer Hiram Roe.  He refused to sell his land to the city until it was promised that the cemetery be named in his honor.  It is located in the north east section of the Lincoln Square community area.

Rosehill's Joliet-limestone entrance gate (added in 1864) was designed by William W. Boyington, the architect of the Chicago Water Tower and the Old University of Chicago, who is buried in Rosehill.  The Rosehill Cemetery Administration Building and Entry Gate was listed on the U.S. National Register of Historic Places in 1975.

Like its sister cemetery Graceland, Rosehill is the burial place of many well-known Chicagoans. The cemetery contains many monuments that are notable for their beauty and eccentricity, such as that of Lulu Fellows.

The cemetery is also the final resting place of 61 victims of the Iroquois Theatre fire, in which over 600 people died.

Several graves, gravestones and monuments from the old City Cemetery, originally located in what is now Lincoln Park were relocated to Rosehill Cemetery.

Landmarks

Rosehill Mausoleum

Dedicated in 1914, Rosehill Mausoleum  was designed by architect Sidney Lovell. It is the largest mausoleum in Chicago and has two levels, the lower level being partially underground. The interior is constructed almost entirely of marble. The floors are Italian Carrara marble. There are many small family-owned rooms with heavy bronze gates. Some of these private rooms feature stained glass windows designed by Louis Comfort Tiffany among other artists. Richard B. Ogilvie, Governor of Illinois, is entombed near the ceiling in the west part of the Mausoleum. Other notables include Aaron Montgomery Ward, his business rival Richard Warren Sears, and John G. Shedd, philanthropist and president of Marshall Field & Company. The mausoleum has been expanded several times.

Horatio N. May Chapel
Built in 1899, the Horatio N. May Chapel was designed by architect Joseph Lyman Silsbee. It is designed in a blend of Gothic and Romanesque styles, with an exterior of granite and an interior appointed with mosaic floors and a graceful oak roof with "hammer-beam trusses and curved brackets."

Civil War Memorials

Civil War buffs have long been attracted to Rosehill, where approximately 350 Union soldiers and sailors and at least three Confederates who gave their lives in service are entombed. It is the final resting place for several members of the 8th Illinois Cavalry, the unit that fired the first shots in the Battle of Gettysburg, and of a general whose troops helped Ulysses S. Grant avoid surrender in the Battle of Shiloh, Grant's first major engagement of the war. Rosehill Cemetery maintains the distinction of being the largest private burial ground of Union veterans, including 16 generals, in the state of Illinois. To honor those who fought for country and cause, Rosehill officially opened its own Civil War Museum on January 15, 1995.

Chicago Volunteer Firefighter's Memorial
A monument "To Honor All the Courageous Volunteer Firefighters of Chicago" was erected in Rosehill Cemetery in  1864. The monument, designed by Leonard Volk, features a vigilant fireman standing atop a tall column. A fire hose is wrapped around the base. Four old-style hydrants make up the corners of the memorial. The granite marker at the base contains the names of all firefighters killed in the line of duty.

In film
Rosehill was featured in the film  Next of Kin (1989). The funeral scene in Backdraft (1991) takes place at the Volunteer Firefighter's Monument at Rosehill, but was actually filmed elsewhere using a replica of this monument. Lulu Fellowes (the girl in the glass box) also appeared in the film U.S. Marshals (1998).

West Ridge Nature Preserve
In 2015, the Chicago Park District Park No. 568 – West Ridge Nature Preserve was established along the north western edge of Rosehill Cemetery. The park land, which was once part of the cemetery, features 20.585 acres of restored woodland, native plants, boardwalks, a 4.5 acre pond, a multipurpose trail around the park with elevated overlooks, educational and interpretive signage for easy identification of plantings, fishing stations and wildlife viewing opportunities.

Notable burials

References

External links

 Official website
 Rosehill Cemetery Civil War Museum
 
 Photographs of Rosehill Cemetery
 
 

Cemeteries in Chicago
National Register of Historic Places in Chicago
1864 establishments in Illinois
Cemeteries on the National Register of Historic Places in Illinois
Rural cemeteries
Chicago Landmarks